Johnson County Airport,  is a county-owned public-use airport located  northeast of the central business district of Buffalo, Wyoming, a city in Johnson County, Wyoming, United States. It is included in the Federal Aviation Administration (FAA) National Plan of Integrated Airport Systems for 2017–2021, in which it is categorized as a local general aviation facility.

Facilities and aircraft 
Johnson County Airport covers an area of 240 acres (97 ha) at an elevation of 4,970 feet (1,515 m) above mean sea level. It has one runway: 13/31 is 6,143 by 75 feet (1,872 x 23 m) with an asphalt surface.

For the 12-month period ending June 30, 2017, the airport had 5,295 aircraft operations, an average of 14 per day: 99% general aviation, 2% air taxi, and <1% military.
In August 2018, there was 30 aircraft based at this airport: 26 single-engine, 2 multi-engine, 1 jet, and 1 helicopter.

Historical airline service 

According to the April 15, 1975 edition of the Official Airline Guide (OAG), Trans Mountain Airlines, a small Denver-based commuter air carrier which was also known as Trans Mountain Air, was operating scheduled passenger flights every weekday on a round trip routing of Cheyenne, WY (CYS) - Casper, WY (CPR) - Buffalo, WY (BYG) - Sheridan, WY (SHR) with small twin engine prop aircraft.

Accidents and incidents 
 July 31, 1979: Western Airlines Flight 44 with 94 passengers on board mistakenly landed here instead of its intended destination of Sheridan County Airport in Sheridan, Wyoming. The Boeing 737-200 jetliner caused minor damage to the runway due to its weight; however, there were no injuries reported.

See also
List of airports in Wyoming

References

External links 
 

Airports in Wyoming
 Buildings and structures in Buffalo, Wyoming